Confessions of a Hitman is a Canadian crime drama film, directed by Luc Picard and released in 2021. Based on Gallant: confessions d’un tueur à gages, a 2015 non-fiction book written by Éric Thibault and Félix Séguin about Canadian contract killer Gerald Gallant, the film stars Picard as Gallant.

The film's cast also includes David La Haye, Sandrine Bisson, Éveline Gélinas, Dany Boudreault, Emmanuel Charest, Jean-François Boudreau, Bobby Beshro, Maxim Gaudette, Louise Portal, Raymond Cloutier and Catherine De Léan.

The film was shot in 2019, on a budget of $6.6 million.

The film premiered at the 2021 Whistler Film Festival, where Picard won the award for Best Director of a Borsos Competition Film. It is slated for commercial release in March 2022.

The film received three Canadian Screen Award nominations at the 10th Canadian Screen Awards in 2022, for Best Supporting Actor (La Haye), Best Adapted Screenplay (Sylvain Guy) and Best Hair (Denis Parent and Jean-Luc Lapierre).

References

External links

Confessions (version in French with English subtitles) at Library and Archives Canada

2021 films
2021 drama films
Canadian crime drama films
Films directed by Luc Picard
Films based on non-fiction books about organized crime
French-language Canadian films
2020s Canadian films